Mohammad Noor Hossain (born December 3, 1992) is a Bangladeshi cricketer. A leg spinner and a useful lower-order batsman, Hossain's most memorable performance to date is his 65 at number eight against Zimbabwe Under-19s in a one-dayer in November 2009 to help Bangladesh Under-19s win by one wicket.

References

External links
 

1992 births
Living people
Bangladeshi cricketers
Dhaka Division cricketers
Sylhet Strikers cricketers
Khulna Tigers cricketers
Chittagong Division cricketers
Bangladesh under-23 cricketers
Bangladesh A cricketers
Cricketers from Dhaka